The Legislative Council of Papua and New Guinea was a legislative body in Papua New Guinea between 1951 and 1963. It was established by the Papua and New Guinea Act 1949 of Australia, which provided for the combined administration of the Territory of Papua and Territory of New Guinea under the United Nations trust territory system. It had the power to make Ordinances for the "peace, order and good government" of the territory, subject to the assent of the Australian-appointed Administrator.

The Legislative Council initially consisted of 28 members and the Administrator: sixteen "official members" representing the Territorial administrator, three non-official elected members, three non-official members "representing the interests of the Christian missions in the Territory", three non-official native members, and three other non-official members. As a result, it was considered to be largely dominated by the Australian administration.

The first elections were held in 1951, with the first council sittings beginning in November 1951. In the first elections, there were only 664 people on the electoral roll in Papua, 537 on the New Guinea mainland and 496 in the New Guinea islands, with "not much more than half of those enrolled" voting. The Australian administration surrendered its majority in reforms in 1960 following international pressure for decolonisation, which increased membership to 37: 14 nominated officials, 12 elected members and 10 non-elected members, at least five of which were required to be indigenous.

It was abolished in May 1963 and replaced by the House of Assembly of Papua and New Guinea (with effect from 1964) following a United Nations Trusteeship Council report that had recommended the establishment of a parliament in the territory.

References
Notes

Citations

Politics of Papua and New Guinea
1949 establishments in Papua New Guinea
1963 disestablishments in Papua New Guinea